In grammar, the ergative-genitive case (abbreviated ) is a grammatical case which combines the senses of the ergative case and the genitive case, transmitting the ideas of acting and possessing something. It can be found in Classic Maya and Inuktitut. 

Grammatical cases
Genitive construction